The Bank of Poland (Bank Polski) is the name of two former banks in Poland, each of which acted as a central bank. The first institution was founded by Prince Francis Xavier Drucki-Lubecki in 1828 in the Kingdom of Congress Poland. The second was established in 1924 under the Second Polish Republic by Prime Minister Władysław Grabski and was liquidated in 1952. Their legacy is continued by Poland's present central bank, the National Bank of Poland (NBP), founded in 1945.

History 

The first Bank of Poland was founded in Warsaw in 1828 by Prince Drucki-Lubecki. An institution of the government of the Kingdom of Poland, it was entitled with issuance of the Polish currency as well as control over the credit rates. It was also entitled with a concession to operate foreign currencies and buy off credits issued by foreign companies and banks.

Throughout its existence, the Bank of Poland was allowed to issue banknotes and coins up to the amount of its stock (initially 30,000,000 złotych, 42 million in 1834 and 53 million in 1841). As a legal entity, the bank also financed a number of important enterprises in the Russian sector of partitioned Poland. Between 1829 and 1837 it spent a large part of its income on road construction, until 1842 it was also the main sponsor of the coal mining development in the region of Zagłębie and the Old Polish Industrial Area around Skarżysko-Kamienna. Seriously crippled by administrative measures after the November Uprising, after the January Uprising it was made subordinate directly to the Russian Imperial Ministry of Treasury. During the period of liquidation of Polish institutions following the failed uprising, in 1870 it was deprived of the rights of a currency issuing organ and banned from giving long-term credits. The institution functioned until 1885, when it was absorbed entirely by the State Bank of the Russian Empire.
 

When Poland regained its independence in 1918, it was lacking a central bank. Following the State Treasury Repair Act of January 11, 1924, minister Władysław Grabski created a new Bank of Poland as a joint stock company. Its stock was soon raised from the initial 100,000,000 złotych to 150 million, split onto 1.5 million shares. The bank was independent of the government of Poland, though it carried out its monetary policies. As the main shareholder, the President of Poland had the right to name the chairman and deputy chairman of the bank's board of trustees.

Prior to the Polish Defensive War of 1939 against Nazi Germany and the Soviet Union, all of the gold reserves (105,000 kg) were evacuated from Poland to the Banque de France in Paris, and then most of it to Canada and London. The Bank continued its functioning in exile, as the central bank of the Polish Government in Exile and financed most of its armed forces, while in occupied Poland the Third Reich created its puppet Bank Emisyjny w Polsce (Emissionsbank in Polen, Krakau). The German Reichsbank in 1940 issued its own currency, the so-called German "Krakow-Zloty". Until December 31, 1944 the Bank of Poland in exile had a formal monopoly for printing currency.

Similar to other "Allied Military Currency"-bank notes, American "Liberation banknotes" for Poland were printed in 1944.

On 15 January 1945 the new communist authorities of Poland founded the National Bank of Poland (Narodowy Bank Polski NBP). In 1946 the remaining pre-war gold reserves weren't returned to Poland, but the Polish Government in Exile remained in force until 1990. On 7 January 1952 the Bank of Poland itself was liquidated and its role was taken by the Narodowy Bank Polski.

The former Bank Polski should not be confused with PKO Bank Polski, which was integrated into the Narodowy Bank Polski in 1975.

References

External links
 

Banks of Poland
Economic history of Poland
Establishments in Congress Poland
1924 establishments in Poland
1820s establishments in Poland
Disestablishments in Congress Poland
Companies set up in the Second Republic of Poland
de:Narodowy Bank Polski#Bank Polski